Michael William Brescia (born February 10, 1972) is an American convicted bank robber who has also been alleged to have been involved in the Oklahoma City bombing.

Background
Of Italian and Irish ancestry, he was born to William and Kathleen ( McNulty) Brescia. He has one brother. He grew up in the Andorra neighborhood of Philadelphia, Pennsylvania, where his father was a firefighter and his mother was an accountant. Brescia was both a member of the Aryan Republican Army and a part-time student at La Salle University, at the time of his arrest.

Extremism involvement
While a student at La Salle University, Brescia attempted to create a white supremacist group on campus. In 1993, during his third-year at the school, he abruptly dropped out of school and told friends he was moving to Oklahoma for a job. He actually moved to Elohim City, a white separatist community in Eastern Oklahoma. While staying at Elohim City, Brescia was roommates with Andreas Strassmeir, a German national who was phoned by Timothy McVeigh two weeks prior to the bombing.

Aryan Republican Army
Brescia was recruited for the Aryan Republican Army (ARA) by Aryan Nations Pennsylvania state leader, Mark W. Thomas. The ARA committed 22 bank robberies across the Midwest between 1994 and 1996, seven of which Brescia was accused of being involved in. Brescia was arrested for bank robbery on January 30, 1997 and later pleaded guilty to bank robbery charges and was sentenced to 57 months in federal prison. Brescia was released from prison on March 22, 2001.

"John Doe #2" Allegations
The Daily Telegraph ran an interview with a witness named Connie Smith who said "I kept telling them that the man in the (John Doe II) sketch was that Mike guy, a nice-looking guy, dark-skinned. But the FBI made me feel guilty, then ignorant, as if I didn't know what I was saying. Then, later, I tried to call in with more information and they wouldn't even talk to me." Strassmeir claimed that on the day of the bombing, Brescia was in Arkansas attending a rally protesting the execution of Richard Wayne Snell.

Federal officials have stated that there is no link between the ARA robberies and the Oklahoma City bombing.

References

1972 births
American bank robbers
American neo-Nazis
Oklahoma City bombing
Criminals from Philadelphia
Living people
La Salle University alumni
American people of Italian descent
American people of Irish descent